Rick Aponte (born April 3, 1956 in El Seibo, Dominican Republic) is a former Major League Baseball bullpen coach for the Washington Nationals, who served from 2007 to 2008. He is currently the pitching coach for the Tri-City ValleyCats.

References

External links

1956 births
Living people
Washington Nationals coaches
Major League Baseball bullpen coaches
Covington Astros players
Cocoa Astros players
Daytona Beach Astros players
Charleston Charlies players
Columbus Astros players
Tucson Toros players